The Auster AOP.6 was a British military air observation aircraft produced by Auster Aircraft Limited to replace the numerous wartime Taylorcraft Auster aircraft then in-service.

History
The Auster AOP.6 (Auster Model K) was designed as a successor to the Taylorcraft Auster V, it had a strengthened fuselage, increased all-up weight and a 145 hp (108 kW) de Havilland Gipsy Major 7 engine. It had a different appearance to the wartime Austers due to the lengthened landing gear struts (due to the larger propeller), and external non-retractable aerofoil flaps.

An initial production run of 296 were completed for the Royal Air Force in 1949. A second batch was produced from 1952 with a total delivered of around 400. Some aircraft ordered by the Royal Air Force aircraft were diverted to the Belgian Air Force (22) and the Royal Hong Kong Auxiliary Air Force (2). New aircraft were delivered to Royal Canadian Air Force, South African Air Force, and the Arab Legion Air Force (Jordan).

A dual-control training version of the AOP.6 was produced, 77 serving as the Auster T.7 (Auster Model Q). These flew alongside the AOP.6 in the AOP squadrons.

In 1955 two T.7 aircraft were modified for use on the 1956 Commonwealth Trans-Antarctic Expedition, being designated Auster Antarctic (Auster Model C4). The aircraft had extra radio equipment, larger tail surfaces, the ability to be fitted with floats or skis as required and a bright yellow finish to increase visibility against the snow and ice.

The aircraft was gradually replaced with the Auster AOP.9 from 1955 and surplus aircraft were converted to civilian use, first as the Auster 6A and later as the Beagle A.61 Terrier.

Variants

Production
Model K - Auster AOP.6
Production aircraft, 378 built
Model Q - Auster T.7
Dual-control training variant of the AOP.6, 84 built.
Auster AOP.8
Proposed three-seat AOP variant of the T.7, not built.

Conversions
Auster T.7 Antarctic
Two T.7s converted for use in the 1956 Commonwealth Trans-Antarctic Expedition.
Auster T.10
AOP.6s converted to T7 standard, 10 conversions.
Auster 6A Tugmaster
Former military aircraft converted for use as a civil glider tug.
Beagle A.61 Terrier
Former military aircraft converted for civil use.
Marshalls MA.4
An Auster T7 modified by Marshalls of Cambridge with a new wing and larger tailplane. Perforations in the wing, ailerons and flaps were connected to a suction pump driven by an auxiliary gas turbine engine in the fuselage. The aircraft was used for research into boundary layer control. The sole example, Serial VF665, lost control and crashed on 8 March 1966 in Suffolk, killing both crew.

Operators

Military operators

Royal Australian Air Force (Two AOP.6 aircraft only).

Belgian Army (AOP.6)
Belgian Air Force (AOP.6)

Burma Air Force (T.7)

Royal Canadian Air Force (AOP.6 and T.7)

Royal Hong Kong Auxiliary Air Force

Indian Air Force
Indian Army

 (Transjordania)
Arab Legion (AOP.6 and T.7)
Royal Jordanian Air Force

Royal New Zealand Air Force - One Auster T.7c was used by the RNZAF for the 1956 Commonwealth Trans-Antarctic Expedition.
No. 3 Squadron RNZAF

Pakistan Air Force (AOP.6)
Pakistan Army (AOP.6)
Pakistan Army Aviation Corps - Ex-Pakistan Air Force aircraft.

South African Air Force (AOP.6)

British Army
Army Air Corps
Royal Air Force (AOP.6 and T.7)
No. 8 Squadron RAF
No. 209 Squadron RAF
No. 267 Squadron RAF
No. 651 Squadron RAF
No. 652 Squadron RAF
No. 656 Squadron RAF
No. 657 Squadron RAF
No. 659 Squadron RAF
No. 661 Squadron RAF
No. 662 Squadron RAF
No. 663 Squadron RAF
No. 664 Squadron RAF
No. 666 Squadron RAF
No. 227 Operational Conversion Unit RAF

Specifications (AOP.6)

See also

References

Notes

Bibliography

Halley, J.J., The Squadrons of the Royal Air Force & Commonwealth 1918-1988, Air-Britain, Tonbridge, .

External links

1940s British military reconnaissance aircraft
High-wing aircraft
Single-engined tractor aircraft
Auster aircraft